Marko Frank (born December 25, 1968) was an East German Nordic combined skier who competed in the late 1980s. At the 1988 Winter Olympics in Calgary, he finished fifth in the 3 x 10 km team and eighth in the 15 km individual events.

Frank's best individual career was third in a 15 km individual event in Italy in 1987. His best World Cup finish was seventh in a 15 km individual event in Switzerland in 1988.

External links

Nordic combined skiers at the 1988 Winter Olympics
German male Nordic combined skiers
Living people
1968 births
Olympic Nordic combined skiers of East Germany